John Edward "Sheriff" Singleton (November 27, 1896 – October 23, 1937) was a Major League Baseball pitcher and National Football League halfback and wingback. As a baseball player, Singleton was a member of the Philadelphia Phillies in the  season. In 22 career games, he had a 1–10 record with a 5.90 ERA. He batted and threw right-handed.

Singleton was born in Gallipolis, Ohio and died in Dayton, Ohio.

External links

Pro-Football-Reference.com

1896 births
1937 deaths
Philadelphia Phillies players
Major League Baseball pitchers
Baseball players from Ohio
People from Gallipolis, Ohio
Maysville Angels players
Chillicothe Babes players
Dayton Triangles players